Delia Matache (born 7 February 1982), commonly referred to as simply Delia, is a Romanian singer and songwriter. She has established herself as one of the most successful Romanian artists, releasing multiple hit singles on native record charts, including "Nu e vina mea" ("It Is Not My Fault"; 2002; as part of the duo N&D), "Parfum de fericire" ("Perfume of Happiness"; 2003), "Pe aripi de vânt" ("On Wind's Wings"; 2014), "Da, mamă" ("Yes, Mother"; 2015), "Cum ne noi" ("How We Us"; 2015) and "Ne vedem noi" ("We'll See Each Other"; 2020), "Cum am știut" ("How I knew"; 2022)

Life and career
Matache was born in Bucharest, Romania and graduated from the Dinu Lipatti music high school after having taken piano and flute studies for five years. She has a brother Eduard and a sister Oana; her mother's name is Gina. Matache's music career started in 1999, in 11th grade, after being approached by Nick (Nicolae Marin) to be part of the duo N&D. Until their disbandment in 2002, they released three albums and several singles, including the Romanian Top 100 number-one "Nu e vina mea" ("It Is Not My Fault"; 2001). In 2003, Matache started her solo career, adopting a more sexualized image and receiving more press coverage from tabloids. That same year, she premiered "Parfum de fericire" ("Perfume of Happiness"), which was successful in Romania, reaching number four, as well as her debut solo studio album of the same name.

Upon having attempted to represent Romania at the Eurovision Song Contest 2006 with the songs "Baby" and "Gândești prea High" ("You Think Too High") written by Costi Ioniță, Matache released her second album Listen Up! in June 2006, which contained the moderately successful single "Listen Up" featuring Matteo. In 2008, the singer participated in the dance competition Dansez pentru tine, the Romanian version of Dancing With the Stars, with partner Ionuț Pavel. In 2009, Matache also took part in the Golden Stag Festival, performing "I Will Survive" by Gloria Gaynor.

"Ipotecat" ("Mortgaged") and "Pe aripi de vânt" ("On Wind's Wings"), both released in 2014, became Matache's first solo number-one singles in Romania, with both topping the Airplay 100 chart. The singer followed this with another number-one, "Cum ne noi" ("How We Us"), in 2015 as a featured artist alongside Carla's Dreams, and with a string of top ten releases from 2015 to 2017, including "Da, mamă" ("Yes, Mother"; 2015), "Gura ta" ("Your Mouth"; 2016) and "Rămâi cu bine" ("All the Best"; 2017), the latter from her third solo album 7 (2020). Matache's 2020 single "Ne vedem noi" ("We'll See Each Other") with Smiley also became a number-one hit.

Delia has been a juror on X Factor România for multiple seasons starting with the 2012 one. Since 2016, she has been a judge on the comedy show iUmor. In 2016 and 2019, Matache held the high-production concerts Deliria and Acadelia at Sala Palatului; there, she also performed more recent material whose style is oriented towards pop rock and trap. Matache is a supporter of people suffering from psoriasis, and of the LGBT community. Her 2018 single "Acadele" alludes to the 2018 Romanian constitutional referendum regarding the constitutional definition of a family.

Discography

Albums

Studio albums

Collaborative albums

Compilations

Live albums

Singles

As lead artist

As featured artist

Promotional singles

Guest appearances

Awards and nominations

Notes

References

External links
 
 Delia at Discogs

1982 births
English-language singers from Romania
Living people
Musicians from Bucharest
Romanian women pop singers
Romanian singer-songwriters
Romanian television personalities
Global Records artists
21st-century Romanian singers
21st-century Romanian women singers